Archibald Hubbard (7 February 1883 – 1967, alternatively known as Archie Hubbard or Ranji Hubbard) was an English association footballer. Predominately an inside forward, he was also capable of playing as a winger or a centre forward.

Career

Born in Leicester, Hubbard spent much of his early career in the local area with Leicester Imperial, St Andrews and Leicester, as well as a period at Humberstone Victoria. He joined Football League club Leicester Fosse (now known as Leicester City) as an amateur in March 1904, turning professional at the start of the 1904–05 season. After three years at Leicester, Hubbard moved south, joining 1906–07 Southern League champions Fulham in May 1907, and Watford eight months later. In 1908–08, his only complete season at Watford, Hubbard made the most appearances of any Watford player, and also finished as the top scorer with 16 goals from 42 games.

After leaving Watford in May 1909, Hubbard returned north, firstly with Norwich City, and later Grimsby Town—with whom he won the Midland League—and Lincoln City. He finished his career in his hometown with former club Leicester Imperial.

References

1883 births
1967 deaths
English footballers
Association football forwards
English Football League players
Southern Football League players
Footballers from Leicester
Leicester City F.C. players
Norwich City F.C. players
Watford F.C. players
Fulham F.C. players
Grimsby Town F.C. players
Lincoln City F.C. players